Koreatomy Automobile Parts Industries Company is a Korean automotive manufacturing company headquartered in Munrae-dong Yeongdeungpo-gu Seoul, South Korea. It was established in 1988 as Koreatomy Automobile Industries Co., Ltd. The company is a supplier of air suspension based in truck and bus driveline and chassis to pusher axle in automobile parts technology. It provides components and systems to the commercial vehicle, off-highway/construction and logistic industries. licensed by Daehan Logistics and manufactures commercial vehicle use air suspension products in joint ventures.

Koreatomy products include automatic and manual air suspensions for trucks and buses; chassis components; shocks and struts; electronic air tube damping systems including Continuous Damping Control (CDC), Active Suspension (AS); Electronic Stability Control (ESC); axle drives; pusher axle system; less vibration system; and industrial drives.

Through the air suspension technology display position steering components and systems are produced, including air tube; Electric Power Steering (EPS); and hydro pusher axle. Its primary competitors are Hyundai Mobis and ZF Friedrichshafen.

History
1988:Established in Koreatomy Automobile Industries Co., Ltd., Technical licensed by Putzmeister Germany Korean agent
1994:Technical licensed by Altas Germany Korean agent and MKG Crane Germany Korean agent
1995:Technical licensed by Hi-Steer (Link manufacturing)-USA in Korean agent, Manufactured Tri-Axle System for sale, Technical licensed by Supplier of Asia Automobile Co., Ltd., The first certified modification of truck Chassis by Korean Ministry Construction and Transportation
2000:Developed and certified Less Vibration System
2001:Established in Shanghai agent
2002:Certified Pusher Axle System, Start marketing of Less Vibration System, Expanded business to manufacturing and marketing KTM 22.5 ton Multi Cargo, Start export KT-9000S/12000NS to China
2003:Technical licensed by Timbren-Canada, Korean agent
2004:Expanded business to manufacturing and marketing KTM 23 to 24 Ton Multi Cargo and KTM Less Vibration axle system wing body truck, and Less Vibration system for Bus suspension In China, Automobile parts supplier of licensed by Anhui Ankai Automobile Co., Ltd.
2005:Expanded business to manufacturing and marketing in Multi Cargo and Wing Body Cargo air suspension parts, Automobile parts supplier of licensed by Dongfeng Motor Co., Ltd. and Xiamen Kinglong Motor Co., Ltd.
2006:Thanks award trade to Hyundai Motor Company 
2007:OEM trade manufacturer by Hyundai Motor Company
2008:Event opening in KoreaTomy 20th anniversary
2009:Company changed by Koreatomy Automobile Parts Industries Company

Parts products
Truck and bus based air suspension
Pusher axle system
Less vibration system

Special purpose vehicles and chassis parts
Hyundai Trago - 22 to 27 ton air suspension parts
Hyundai New Power Truck - 8 to 27 ton air suspension parts
24 ton multi cargo (17 ton low deck) 
23.5 ton multi cargo (15 ton low deck) 
27 ton multi cargo (19.5 ton) 
11.5 ton wing body (11.5 ton ling deck)    
10 ton wing body low deck cargo (tag axle) 
13 ton cargo (9.5 ton) 
18 ton long deck cargo (11.5 ton long deck)
Hyundai Mega Truck - 4.5 to 5 ton air suspension parts
4.5 ton to 5 ton wing body cargo (4.5 ton/5 ton ultra long deck)        
7 ton long deck cargo (5 ton long deck cargo)
Daewoo Novus - 4.5 to 27 ton air suspension parts
24 ton cargo (pullcar)
27 ton multi cargo
11.5 ton ultra long deck wing body cargo (15.5 ton long deck)
Daehan Logistics all use chassis
Other truck air suspension chassis of Volvo FM, Scania 112, Mercedes-Benz Actros, MAN TGA, Iveco Stralis
Other bus air suspension chassis of Hyundai Universe, Hyundai Aero, Hyundai Aero City, Hyundai Aero Town

Export truck air suspension chassis parts models
Mitsubishi Fuso Fighter
Mitsubishi Fuso Super Great
Mitsubishi Fuso FK
Mitsubishi Fuso FM
Mitsubishi Fuso FP/FV
Isuzu Forward
Isuzu Giga
Isuzu F-Series
Isuzu E-Series
Nissan Diesel Condor
Nissan Diesel Quon
Hino Ranger
Hino Profia

Manufacturing and marketing models

Current manufacturing parts model
Koreatomy 24 ton multi cargo 
KTM 23.5 ton multi cargo 
KTM 27 ton multi cargo 
KTM 11.5 ton LV (Less Vibration) wing body
KTM 10 ton wing body low deck cargo (tag axle) 
KTM 13 ton cargo
KTM 18 ton long deck cargo
KTD 24M, 24 ton cargo (fullcar) 
KTD 27S, 27 ton multi cargo 
KTD 11.5-UL 11.5 ton ultra long deck wing body cargo
KTM 4.5 to 5 ton wing body cargo 
KTM 7 ton long deck cargo

Development parts model
KTM 27 Ton Multi Cargo 
KTM 11.5 Ton Wing Body Cargo 
KTM 4.5 Ton Wing Body Cargo 
KTM 5 Ton Multi Cargo 
KTM 7 Ton Multi Cargo 
KTM 23 Ton Multi Cargo 
KTM 24 Ton Multi Cargo

Pusher axle system model
KT-9000S/6500S 
KT-12000S/14000NS

Overseas parts manufacturers
Tumel Trading Company (Shanghai, China)

See also
Air suspension
Daehan Logistics

External links 
 Koreatomy Automobile Parts Industries Company Official Homepage 

Auto parts suppliers of South Korea
Companies established in 1988